Podocarpus polystachyus is a species of conifer in the family Podocarpaceae. It is found in Brunei, Indonesia, Malaysia, Papua New Guinea, the Philippines, Singapore, and Thailand.

References

polystachyus
Least concern plants
Taxonomy articles created by Polbot
Plants described in 1847